Dennis Cabanada Villarojo (born April 18, 1967) is a Filipino prelate of the Catholic Church who is the fifth bishop of the Diocese of Malolos in the Philippines.

Early life and studies 
He completed his high school formation at the Colegio de San Jose- Recoletos in Cebu City. He entered San Carlos Seminary College of the Archdiocese of Cebu where he finished his philosophical studies. Later, he continued his priestly training at the Pontifical and Royal University of Santo Tomas in Manila, where he took his theological studies, and obtained his licentiate degree in Ecclesiastical Philosophy.

He was ordained deacon by Jaime Cardinal Sin in Manila on 1993. A year later on June 10, 1994, he was ordained priest for the Archdiocese of Cebu. For four years, from 1994 to 1998, he was personal secretary of Ricardo Cardinal Vidal, the Ordinary of the Archdiocese at that time.

From 1998 to 2001, Monsignor Villarojo continued his post-graduate studies in Philosophy, in Rome, at the Pontifical University of the Holy Cross, where he earned his doctorate in this discipline.

After studying in Rome, he returned to his country and continued, until 2010, to take the task as secretary of Cardinal Vidal and at the same time as coordinator of the pastoral planning board of the archdiocese.

Since 2010, Monsignor Villarojo has been the chairman of the pastoral team at the parish of the Our Lady of the Sacred Heart in Barangay Capitol Site, Cebu City. In 2012, he was also appointed secretary-general of the 51st International Eucharistic Congress, which was held in Cebu, in January 2016.

Episcopacy 
On 3 July 2015, Pope Francis designated Monsignor Villarojo as one of the auxiliary bishops of Cebu. He was consecrated bishop on 10 August 2015 at the Metropolitan Cathedral of the Archdiocese of Cebu, by Archbishop José S. Palma, the current Ordinary of the Archdiocese. Ricardo Cardinal Vidal (Cardinal Archbishop Emeritus of Cebu), and Giuseppe Pinto (Papal Nuncio to the Philippines) were the co-consecrators.

On May 14, 2019, Pope Francis has designated Bishop Villarojo as the new bishop of the Diocese of Malolos. He was installed on August 21, 2019 by Luis Antonio Tagle, Archbishop of Manila together with Gabriele Giordano Caccia, then Apostolic Nuncio to the Philippines.

Coat of arms
Bishop Villarojo's personal Coat of Arms is blazoned as follows:

As Auxiliary Bishop of Cebu
Arms: Per fesse, in dexter base Gules a mullet of six points, and in sinister base a Sun in splendour, all Or; in chief Argent and issuant from the base the Shrine of Magellan's Cross Proper.

The shield is surmounted by a Bishop's cross and by a Roman galero of this rank, i.e., Vert with six tassels of the same pendant (1,2,3) at both sides.

The symbolism of the heraldic achievement is as follows:

The Magellan's Cross Kiosk in the upper white field (chief Argent) symbolizes his being a Cebuano bishop. It is also the 51st International Eucharistic Congress Pilgrim Symbol. Bishop Villarojo is also the Secretary-General of the 51st International Eucharistic Congress.

The red base of the coat of arms represents the Martyrdom of Saint Denis, Patron of Paris, France, of Saint Pedro Calungsod (a Cebuano Martyr and the 2nd Filipino Saint), and of Saint Lawrence of Rome (another martyr), whose feast is commemorated by the Catholic Church on August 10 - the day of Bishop Villarojo's Episcopal Ordination. The color red has also another significance. The Official Newspaper of the Archdiocese of Cebu referred to the color's connection with the family name of the Bishop, which is translated in Cebuano as: "Adunay kalambigitan sa akong bangsagon nga Villarojo, kinatsila sa "dakong balay o gamayng lungsod nga pula" (A big house or a small city of red).

The six-pointed star (mullet of six points) on the dexter side (right side with reference to the bearer) represents the Blessed Virgin Mary. This star is also a seen on the Image of Our Lady of Mount Carmel. Bishop Villarojo is a member of the Third Order of the Order of the Discalced Carmelites.

On the sinister side (left side with reference to the bearer) of the base is a Sun in splendour, which represents the Pontifical and Royal University of Santo Tomas where he studied Theology. The sun is also symbolic of the Light of the Truth - Christ.

As Bishop of Malolos
The shield is surmounted by a Bishop's cross and by a Roman galero of this rank, i.e., Vert with six tassels of the same pendant (1,2,3) at both sides.

The dexter and sinister sides both refer to the bearer.

Dexter Chief Canton - The church facade seen on blue background is Nuestra Señora del Carmen Parish, otherwise known as Barasoain Church, the historic venue of the 1899 Malolos Congress and birthplace of the First Philippine Republic and the Malolos Constitution.

Sinister Point - The Magellan’s Cross Kiosk in the upper white field symbolizes Cebu City and the Archdiocese of Cebu, where he hails from and was ordained as a priest.

It is also pilgrim symbol of the 51st International Eucharistic, an event where Bishop Villarojo served as secretary-general.
It commemorates the City of Malolos as the first capital of the country, making it one of the province’s most historical landmarks.

Dexter Base - The three cotton “bulak” flowers on the green field symbolize the Province of Bulacan. The cotton’s Tagalog name is the term from which the province’s name was derived. It also symbolizes the abundance of life and welfare in the province.

Sinister Base - The red base of represents the Martyrdom of Saint Denis, patron of Paris, France; of Saint Pedro Calungsod, a Cebuano martyr and the second Filipino saint; and Saint Lawrence of Rome, whose feast is commemorated every August, the day of Bishop Villarojo’s episcopal ordination.

Moreover, the Official Newspaper of the Archdiocese of Cebu referred to red’s connection with the bishop’s family name, which is translated in Cebuano as adunay kalambigitan sa akong bangsagon nga Villarojo, sa dakong balay o gamayng lungsod nga pula (A big house or small city of red).

At the center of this section is a Sun in splendor, representing the Pontifical and Royal University of Santo Tomas, where he studied Theology. The sun is also symbolic of Christ as Light of the Truth.

Center Point - The interwoven “A” and “M” Marian monogram is the Auspice Maria which is Latin for Under the protection of Mary. It also evokes the first two words of the ancient prayer Ave Maria or Haily Mary.

The crown with 12 stars refer to the Woman of Revelation (12:1-2). These symbols represent La Virgen Inmaculada Concepcion de Malolos, titular patroness of the Diocese of Malolos, whose image was canonically crowned in 2012 on the occasion of the Golden Jubilee of the diocese.

The cross that divides the blazon is taken from the seal of the diocese, which symbolizes the unwavering love of Christ for humanity.

The brown color of the cross symbolizes Bishop Villarojo’s devotion to Mary as a member of the Third Order of Discalced Carmelites.

Villarojo's motto is taken from the Book of the Prophet Isaiah 40:1, Consolamini Popule Meus (“Be consoled my people”).

See also
Archdiocese of Cebu
Pontifical and Royal University of Santo Tomas
Pontifical University of the Holy Cross
University of San Jose–Recoletos
Diocese of Malolos

References

1967 births
Living people
21st-century Roman Catholic bishops in the Philippines
People from Cebu City
People from Malolos
University of Santo Tomas alumni
Pontifical University of the Holy Cross alumni